HD 75747, also known as HR 3524 or RS Chamaeleontis (RS Cha),  is a binary star located in the southern circumpolar constellation Chamaeleon. It has an average apparent magnitude of 6.05, making it barely visible to the naked eye. It has an absolute magnitude of +1.21.

HD 75747 was known to be variable since 1960 based on observations by A. W. J. Cousins. The system was first observed as an eclipsing binary in 1967 by astronomers P.  A. T. Wild and  H. C. Lagerweij. J. Andersen deduced a circular orbit with a period of 1.66 days for the system. Subsequent observations revealed that one of the components as a δ Scuti variable. RS Cha is an Algol-type eclipsing binary ranging from 6.02 to 6.58 or 6.68 within 1.6699 days, depending on the eclipse. This system is part of the η Chamaeleontis association, a group of young stars moving with Eta Cha, and Eta Cha is just eight arc-minutes to the northwest of RS Cha.

Both components have a stellar classification of A8 IV, indicating that both objects are slightly evolved A-type subgiants. RS Cha A and B have masses nearly double of the Sun's and 2.14 - 2.34 times the radius of the Sun. RS Cha was originally thought to be 912 million years old, meaning that both stars were evolving off the main sequence. However, astronomer E. Alecian and colleagues re-examined the age of the system and it turns out that HD 75747 is only 9 million years old, making them pre-main sequence stars.

References

Pre-main-sequence stars
A-type subgiants
Algol variables
Eclipsing binaries
Delta Scuti variables
Chamaeleon (constellation)
Chamaeleon, RS
CD-78 00342
075747
042794
3524
Chamaeleontis, 9